Shanika Warren-Markland is a British actress and writer. She is known for her roles in More Than Love and 4.3.2.1.

Early life 
Markland attended Sion Manning Roman Catholic Girls' School in West London.  At the age of thirteen, Markland attended a Youth Theatre group at the Royal National Theatre, where she developed her skills in reading and interpreting scripts.  She joined the Young Blood Theatre in West London.

Career 
Markland began her career in television by playing the lead role of Lillie in Channel 4 program More Than Love, and then went on to secure roles on BBC favourites 'Holby City' and Spooks'  at the young age of sixteen. Markland was signed to the BWH Agency after being spotted at her Young Blood theatre classes.

Markland received her first feature film role playing the character Kayla in BAFTA award-winning director Noel Clarke’s drama ‘Adulthood’. Continuing her work with Clarke, Markland followed her previous work with the co-lead role in film 4.3.2.1. playing the role of Kerrys.
Markland went on to film the role of Ashleigh in British horror ‘Demons Never Die’, and also played the character Langston in the American film ‘The Skinny'. Markland appeared in the British thriller flick ‘Victim’, in which she played Charmaine, which was released in June 2012.

Gone Too Far!, in which Markland played the role of Armani, was screened at the Toronto Film Festival in 2014.

In June 2022, Markland's play Barbie Comes to Tea was performed by the Talawa Theatre Company.

Personal life 
Markland is also an ambassador for Designers Against AIDS, a charitable organization that uses the creatives industries to raise awareness of HIV and AIDS.

Filmography

Television

Film

References

External links
 

Year of birth missing (living people)
Black British actresses
English people of Yoruba descent
Living people